What Have You Done Today Mervyn Day? is a fan club only release by Saint Etienne featuring 18 original and unreleased pieces of music that featured in their film of the same name about the redevelopment of the Lower Lea Valley in London. It was performed live by the band at the film's premiere at the Barbican.

Track listing

References

2006 albums
Saint Etienne (band) albums
Fan-club-release albums